Lo Chih-chiang is Taiwanese politician and a member of the Kuomintang (KMT). From 2010 to 2013, he was first the spokesperson and then the Deputy Secretary-General of the ROC Presidential Office. He was elected to the Taipei City Council in 2018. In 2020, at the invitation of KMT chairman Johnny Chiang, he assumed the directorship of the party school, the Institute of Revolutionary Practice.

Early life and education
Born in Hualien City's Dachen First Village on 26 March 1970, Lo and his family moved to Keelung City at the age of three. Both of his parents moved to Taiwan as part of the 1955 Dachen Evacuation. Lo graduated from the Keelung Senior High School and later on earned his BBA in Business Management from the National Sun Yat-sen University (NSYSU). As a student, Lo was active in debate activities and co-founded the Chinese Speech and Debate Association with Chao Tien-lin. In 1998, Lo ran unsuccessfully for a seat in the Kaohsiung City Council as an independent, receiving 3000 votes. Lo then received his Master of Law from National Chengchi University and worked as an assistant for Chen Changwen at Lee and Li. At the recommendation of Chen, Lo joined Ma Ying-jeou's team.

From 2015 to 2016, Lo was a visiting scholar at Harvard Law School.

Political career

Presidential spokesperson (2010–2011)
Prior to taking office as the presidential spokesperson, Lo served a spokesperson for the Ma-Siew campaign during the 2008 Taiwanese presidential election and the deputy president of the Central News Agency.

Ma-Wu presidential campaign (2012)
Lo was the deputy campaign manager for Ma Ying-jeou and Wu Den-yih during the 2012 ROC Presidential election.

Deputy Secretary-General of the Presidential Office (2012–2013)

Resignation
Lo resigned from his position on 12 September 2013 due to the issues regarding the allegation of the Special Investigation Division of the Supreme Prosecutors' Office against a speaker engaging in influence peddling in a judicial case, as well as other personal and family reasons.

In November of 2013, Lo was then awarded the Order of Brilliant Star with Grand Cordon by President Ma for his service in the administration.

Taipei City Council (2018–present)

2018 city council campaign 
On 24 February 2018, Lo announced his candidacy for District 6 of the Taipei City Council, which includes both Daan District and Wenshan District. 25 people registered to stand for the election with 13 open seats. On 24 November 2018, as part of the 2018 Taiwanese local elections, Lo won 40,391 votes, 13.69% of the total votes, becoming the highest vote-getter in the 13th Taipei City Council election, and received the highest number of votes in 20 years.

KMT presidential primary bid
On 26 November 2018, two days after winning his city council campaign, Lo became the first candidate to his intention to contest the Kuomintang nomination for the 2020 Taiwan presidential election through Facebook. He withdrew from the 2019 Kuomintang presidential primary on 7 April 2019.

KMT Institute of Revolutionary Practice directorship (2020–present)
In 2020, Lo assumed the unpaid voluntary post as the director of the KMT's party school and educational wing, the Institute of Revolutionary Practice Directorship, along with Taipei City Council Member Yu Shu-hui and Taichung City Council Member Huang Chien-hao as the institute's deputy directors. Lo announced the "Future Salon" series, discussions on current events with experts and three to five young audience members as guests. Former President Ma Ying-jeou and Chairman Jonny Chiang were the inaugural guests of the live stream.

Taipei mayoral bid
On 26 January 2020, after reaching 1 million fans on his Facebook Page, Lo fulfilled his earlier promise and announced candidacy for the 2022 Taipei Mayoral election.

Taoyuan mayoral bid
Lo declared his candidacy for the Taoyuan mayoralty in April 2022, despite the Kuomintang's repeated requests that he delay his announcement. Lo resigned from the Taipei City Council to focus on his mayoral campaign. After a closed-door meeting of the party's Central Standing Committee later that month, Chang San-cheng was formally nominated, despite the interest of Lo and legislators  and Lu Ming-che.

Awards and honors
 Order of Brilliant Star with Grand Cordon – Taiwan (Republic of China) 
 2013 HuaiEn Literature Award - HuaiEn Charity Foundation

Personal life
Lo is married to Huang Xui-Ling (Chinese: 黃雪玲) with two daughters.

References

External links
 
 
Lo Chih-Chiang's YouTube Channel (戰神94強)
Lo Chih-Chiang's Line Account

Living people
1970 births
Kuomintang politicians in Taiwan
National Chengchi University alumni
National Sun Yat-sen University alumni
Taipei City Councilors
Taiwanese writers
Taiwanese television personalities
Taiwanese Christians
Recipients of the Order of Brilliant Star